Prince Nikita Dmitrievich Lobanov-Rostovsky (born 6 January 1935), known as Nikita Lobanov, is a Russian Rurikid, geologist, banker, and notable art collector of Russian stage design of the period of 1880–1930 (in particular designs for Ballets Russes).

Lobanov was born on 6 January 1935 in Sofia, Bulgaria, to Russian émigré parents, Dmitry Ivanovich Lobanov-Rostovsky and Irina Vasilievna (née Vyrubova, and from an old Russian noble family). He is a collector of costume and stage designs by Russian artists (1890–1930s), including Sergei Diaghilev's Ballets Russes. He has organised numerous exhibitions, including one at the Metropolitan Museum (1967). He has written several works (Russian Painters and the Stage (1969), Trade Financing (1980) and Banking (1982), etc.).

In 1987 he donated 80 works of art to the Museum of Personal Collections of Pushkin Museum (Moscow), including Alexandra Exter's famous series of Theatrical Decorations (1930). His collection included 1100 works of art. In 2008 he sold it to Russian Government.

Lobanov is a fellow of the Metropolitan Museum of Art, a Regent of the Institute of Modern Russian Culture, and a member of the Board of the Sts. Cyril and Methodius Foundation of Bulgaria, Deputy Chairman of the International Council of Russian Compatriots in Moscow, Chairman of the Russian-speaking Community in the UK, and a member of the jury of the international ballet competition "Tansolymp" in Berlin.

Education

Lobanov-Rostovsky studied geology as an undergraduate at the University of Oxford; he was a member of Christ Church.

He also studied economic geology at Columbia University and accounting at New York University.

Philanthropy

Lobanov-Rostovsky has endowed the Lobanov-Rostovsky Professorship in Earth Sciences at the University of Oxford, his alma mater, along with the annual Lobanov-Rostovsky Lecture in Planetary Geology. Scientists who have contributed extensively to the study of the Universe through the lenses of geology have been speakers, including the prominent Bernard Wood, speaker of the 2022 Lecture.

Literature

 John E. Bowlt. N. D. Lobanov-Rostovsky. Katalog-rezone Khudozhniki Russkogo Teatra / Catalogue-raisonné: Painters of Russian Theatre, 1880–1930. Collection of Nikita and Nina Lobanov-Rostovsky (In Russian, 156 colour and 1026 b/w illustrations.) 1994. 528 pp. ,

Sources

External links

Nikita
Russian art collectors
American art collectors
1935 births
Living people
Scientists from Sofia
Russian princes